Peter Nyman (born 27 September 1966, in Helsinki) is a Finnish journalist and television reporter. He was the presenter of TV programme Uutisvuoto from the show's start in 1998 until 2010, then returned as said presenter in 2019. He also hosted Premier league studio in Canal+ (now C More). Before Uutisvuoto, Nyman was known as a host of Mediapeli.

In his 2007 book Ankkalammikko ('Duck Pond'), he talks about belonging to the Swedish-speaking minority in Finland.

References

Written works

External links
 Oy Ny Man Communication, Consultation & Contemplation Ab

1966 births
Journalists from Helsinki
Finnish television presenters
Mass media people from Helsinki
Living people
Swedish-speaking Finns